James Franklin Clay (October 29, 1840 – August 17, 1921) was a U.S. Representative from Kentucky.

Born in Henderson, Kentucky, Clay attended public and private schools at Henderson. He graduated from Georgetown College, Kentucky, in June 1860. He studied law and was admitted to the bar in 1862, commencing practice in Henderson.

He served as member of the State senate in 1870.

Clay was elected as a Democrat to the 48th Congress and served March 4, 1883 – March 3, 1885.

He was an unsuccessful candidate for renomination in 1884 and resumed law practice in Henderson.

He served as city attorney and as attorney for the St. Louis & Southern Railroad and the Ohio Valley Railway Co.

He died in Henderson, Kentucky, on August 17, 1921 and was interred in Fernwood Cemetery.

References

1840 births
1921 deaths
People from Henderson, Kentucky
Democratic Party members of the United States House of Representatives from Kentucky
Democratic Party Kentucky state senators